Ulises Mahoney (born 1917) is a Panamanian former first baseman in the Negro leagues who played in the 1940s.

A native of Panama, Mahoney played for the Philadelphia Stars in 1944. In 11 recorded games, he posted eight hits and four RBI in 28 plate appearances.

References

External links
 and Seamheads

1917 births
Year of death missing
Date of birth missing
Place of birth missing
Philadelphia Stars players
Baseball first basemen
Panamanian expatriate baseball players in the United States